The NASCAR Cup Series has held stock car races annually at Michigan International Speedway in Brooklyn, Michigan since 1969. Traditionally, the track held two Cup Series races, one in June, around Father's Day weekend and another in August. The August race was not held in 1973 after track owner Roger Penske replaced the race with a Champ Car event. In 2020, both races were held over a single weekend in August due to the COVID-19 pandemic. In 2021, the June race was dropped from the schedule as part of a realignment, with its place on the schedule being given to Texas Motor Speedway to host the All-Star Race.

The races have had many different corporate sponsors over the years and the 2022 event was known as the FireKeepers Casino 400. Kevin Harvick is the defending winner of the race.

Past August winners

Notes
1969 & 2001: Race shortened due to rain.
1977: Race postponed from Sunday to Monday due to rain.
2007: Race postponed twice from Sunday to Tuesday morning due to rain
2007, 2011–12, 2017: Race extended due to an overtime finish.
2020: Race shortened by 22% to 500 km (312 mi) due to the COVID-19 pandemic. However, the race retained the "Consumers Energy 400" name.

Multiple winners (drivers)

Multiple winners (teams)

Manufacturer wins

Notable August races
1970: Restrictor plates made their racing debut in the 1970 Yankee 400 and Charlie Glotzbach drove a Dodge Daytona to the win.
1971: Bobby Allison dueled Allison edged Petty at the stripe for a season sweep at Michigan in the Holman-Moody Mercury.
1973: Although the Yankee 400 was on the NASCAR Winston Cup schedule at the beginning of the 1973 season, set for August 5, Roger Penske announced on June 8 that the 1973 Yankee 400 would not be held, citing the tight schedule that Michigan International Speedway had to accommodate in the summer of 1973.
1974: Promoter Roger Penske reinserted the Yankee 400 to Michigan's schedule after 1973 after the Michigan 400 that June turned a strong profit.  David Pearson and Cale Yarborough fought hard before Cale was stopped by a mismatched set of tires late in the race.  The lead changed 45 times among eight drivers.
1975: A late yellow-flag set up a five-lap finish; Pearson and Richard Petty went at it and the lead changed on every lap down to the finish as Petty edged Pearson by a nose.
1977: Rain postponed the race to Monday and Darrell Waltrip edged Pearson to the stripe.
1978: Pearson's final win for the Wood Brothers came on a one-lap shootout as he passed Waltrip.  Richard Petty crashed in the final laps, setting up the finish; he was making his debut in a second-hand 1974 bodied Chevrolet after abandoning his 1978 Dodge Magnum.
1979: Pearson was hired to drive Rod Osterlund's Chevrolet after Dale Earnhardt was injured at Pocono and he won the Michigan pole, ultimately finishing fourth.  Buddy Baker led late but Richard Petty took tires on a late stop and gunned him down on the final lap; the win began a rally from a 229-point deficit to the season championship.
1981: The most competitive Michigan race ever erupted as Ron Bouchard won his first pole fresh off his electrifying Talladega win.  There were 65 lead changes among 14 drivers and Richard Petty, who led 65 laps, roared from fifth to the lead with five to go and held off six other challengers. "This wasn't the toughest race, but it sure was the most aggravating," Petty said afterward.
1987: Fellow drivers revolted against Tim Richmond at Watkins Glen the week before when he reported to the pre race drivers meeting looking sickly and acting belligerently.  Before Michigan qualifying Richmond had to be rousted out of his motorhome and when he arrived at the qualifying line asked aloud, "Where are we?"  When NASCAR officials Les Richter and Dick Beaty asked Hendrick officials what was wrong with Tim, Richmond appeared from nowhere and confronted both of them, then showed up late for the pre race drivers meeting.  During the 400 he had an anxiety attack and the engine blew; he drove to the garage and when the crew checked the tachometer they found it had been pegged, because Richmond had deliberately over revved the engine to blow it.  It became his final race ever.  Richard Petty rallied to the lead in the final 40 laps but had to pit on a late caution and crashed after colliding with Davey Allison on the final lap as Bill Elliott took the win, his sixth Michigan win in an eight-race span.
1991: Dale Jarrett stayed out on a late caution, and in the final laps Davey Allison ran him down, but became locked in a side-by-side battle won by Jarrett by inches for his first win and the first for the Wood Brothers since 1987 at Charlotte.
1994: Just after Wally Dallenbach Jr. was released from his seat in Richard Petty's Pontiac, Indycar veteran John Andretti took over the seat and turned heads by qualifying second. However, the story of the weekend was a savage crash in practice that left Ernie Irvan critically injured with head injuries. Irvan would recover from near-fatal injury over a year later.  The race itself began with a six-car melee where Bobby Hillin Jr. nearly flew over the second turn wall. Geoff Bodine won on Hoosier Tires.
1998: Irvan dominated the race, but Jeff Gordon ran down the leaders and won handily. Mark Martin was denied the win, the race coming days after the death of his father in a plane crash.
1999: Goodyear brought tires to Michigan designed for Fontana for Winston West racing, where Hoosier Tire was still a presence in competition against Goodyear; the new tire featured greater stagger and handled more like bias-ply tires than radials.  Dale Earnhardt grabbed the lead late and got into a spirited battle with Bobby Labonte before Labonte cleared for the win.
2007. This was the first modern-day NASCAR race to be run on a Tuesday. Kurt Busch dominated all day, leading 96 laps out of the 203. Busch held off Martin Truex Jr and Jimmie Johnson in a Green White Checkered finish for his second win of the season.
2012: Greg Biffle won his second race of 2012 after Jimmie Johnson's engine blew up with five laps to go. The race was also marked by a scary crash on lap 64. Mark Martin was leading Kasey Kahne into turn 4 and was about to lap Bobby Labonte and Juan Pablo Montoya when Labonte got loose and spun. Montoya got away, but Labonte collected Martin and Kahne. While Labonte and Kahne spun into the trioval grass, Martin's car spun down pit road and was impaled on the left rear side by an opening in the pit wall at Kahne's pit stall. Martin climbed out, unharmed. The day was also a sour day for Hendrick supplied engines as three of the six cars with this engine package - Jeff Gordon, Jimmie Johnson and Tony Stewart - all had engine part failures (Johnson had two failed engines, as he blew another one in practice). The other three, Kasey Kahne, Dale Earnhardt Jr. and Ryan Newman, survived for top ten finishes.
2016: This race is memorable for it being the first NASCAR Cup Series victory for Kyle Larson. Chase Elliott would end up finishing second as he did in the prior June race earlier in the year.

Past June winners

Notes
1974: The race was shortened by 10% in response to the fuel crisis.
2000: Race shortened due to rain/darkness.
2006, 2015, and 2018: Race shortened due to rain.
2008, 2019, and 2020: Race extended due to a NASCAR Overtime finish.
2015: The race was red-flagged for a record of four times, laps 13, 19, 44, and 139.
2019: Race postponed from Sunday to Monday afternoon due to rain and extended due to a NASCAR Overtime finish.
2020: Race postponed from June 7 to August 8 and shortened to 500 kilometers (312 miles) due to the COVID-19 pandemic and shortened races caused by new rules for two races on the same weekend. However, the race retained the "FireKeepers Casino 400" name.

Multiple winners (drivers)

Multiple winners (teams)

Manufacturer wins

Notable June races
1969: NASCAR's debut at Michigan International Speedway was a 500-miler where the lead changed 35 times and writer Benny Phillips wrote afterward, "If they gave an Oscar for NASCAR's most exciting race, it would win hands down."  Cale Yarborough escaped to the win when LeeRoy Yarbrough crashed on the final lap.
1970: A scoring controversy marred Cale Yarborough's rally to edge Pete Hamilton in a four-lap battle to the flag.  Yarborough had lost two laps earlier but was scored on the lead lap at the end; Hamilton's car owner Richard Petty protested, "The (scoring) cards have Cale lapping Pete (on a late caution) without the pace car lapping Pete.  That's impossible."  Hamilton and Petty led over 100 laps between them in high-winged Plymouth Superbirds.
1971: Bobby Allison edged Bobby Isaac by a car length for his third straight win of the season, driving the Holman-Moody Mercury.  The lead changed 35 times with Allison, Isaac, and Donnie Allison at times racing three abreast down the mammoth trioval and the lead changing twice on several laps between Bobby Allison and Isaac.
1972: David Pearson took the second of his record nine Michigan wins, dominating in the Wood Brothers Mercury; the win was the third for the Woods in the Michigan 400's first four runnings.  It was the final season the track was operated under the aegis of the defunct empire of Larry Lopatin, as Roger Penske would purchase the facility in 1973.
1974: The rivalry between Richard Petty in the STP Dodge and David Pearson and the Purolator Mercury had begun intensifying in 1973 and reached a new level in 1974 as Petty won the Daytona 500 and Carolina 500 while Pearson had stormed to win the Rebel 450, Winston 500, and World 600.  Petty and Pearson faced off with challenges from the Allison brothers, Cale Yarborough, and Buddy Baker, but on this June 1974 day a rookie from Alsa Craig, Ontario, Earl Ross, found himself in the fight as well.  A late crash put the race under yellow in the final four laps; Pearson pitted for tires thinking the race would restart but it didn't, as Petty took the win and the Canadian rookie Ross finished second with Pearson third.  The lead changed 50 times among nine drivers. Also, this race marked the only Top 5 finish for Marty Robbins.
1976: Pearson's superspeedway vengeance tour of 1976 hit Michigan as Cale Yarborough dominated before losing enough power to finish second to the late rally of The Silver Fox, who posted his seventh win of the season.
1977: Cale Yarborough took his seventh win of the season over Richard Petty, but was upset after the race over the track surface, which had buckled after a hard winter and caused "my car (to jump) out of gear three times."
1979: The lead changed 47 times among eleven drivers and the finish shook into an eight-car battle. In the final laps rookie, Dale Earnhardt hit the apron of Turn Three trying a pass and nearly crashed into Neil Bonnett, Petty, and Darrell Waltrip; both Waltrip and Petty were pointedly critical of Earnhardt ("He nearly took us all out," Waltrip said afterward).  Waltrip's blown transmission in the final two laps secured the win for Buddy Baker.
1980: Benny Parsons, raised in Detroit, took the win at the speedway in his home state.
1981: Another eight-car battle exploded with five to go when Kyle Petty blew his engine in, Turn, Two as the leaders were entering One; Bobby Allison was running seventh when five of the top seven spun in the oil, then down the backstretch, Darrell Waltrip and Dale Earnhardt collided and crashed.  The win was Allison's fourth of the 1981 season and the race turned out to be the final one for car owner Rod Osterlund as he sold his team to mysterious J.D. Stacy.
1982:Televised live on CBS, the race completed 56 laps before rain delayed resumption until late in the evening. Cale Yarborough setup Darrell Waltrip for a last-lap pass on the backstretch, with Waltrip, aggressively blocking and making contact. Yarborough made the pass and won, while Waltrip tried to make contact with Cale after the checkered, but thought better of it and spun into the turn 1 infield. An agitated Waltrip gave a very blunt interview to CBS pit announcer Larry Nuber for the late-night race summary, as the live telecast was abandoned after the rain delay. Helped by the very late mid-June sunset in Michigan, it is probably the latest a NASCAR Cup race ever concluded (about 9:15 pm EDT) at a track without night lighting.
1984: Cale Yarborough's bid for a ninth Michigan win faltered and Bill Elliott ran away from Dale Earnhardt for his first Michigan win and first win on an oval.
1986: Elliott posted a third straight Michigan 400 win, edging Harry Gant, who was competing despite injuries sustained at Pocono the week earlier.
1987: Dale Earnhardt took the win as Tim Richmond finished fourth, what would be the final top-five of Richmond's career.
1989: Rusty Wallace dominated but on a late pitstop Barry Dodson missed the peg under the door for the jack to be secured; the lengthy stop dropped Wallace too far back to challenge Bill Elliott, who took his fourth Michigan 400 win.  Darrell Waltrip led late but "I had too high a gear and it was killing me off the corners."
1990: Bill Elliott's blown engine opened the door to a late duel between Dale Earnhardt and fiery upstart Ernie Irvan, who finished 1–2; Irvan was driving Oldsmobiles for Morgan-McClure Motorsports and before the race, it was revealed that Chevrolet would provide the team with factory backing.
1991: Only one caution flew as the first half of the race erupted into a ferocious multicar duel.  Geoff Bodine and car owner Junior Johnson returned to action after Johnson was suspended for several races, but the primary battle was between Earnhardt, Davey Allison, Mark Martin, and upstart Hut Stricklin, driving for Davey's dad Bobby; the foursome fought it out after a Lap 35 caution and the lead changed over 30 times officially and otherwise, with Earnhardt, in particular, blasting his car into the corners two full seconds deeper than anyone else and the draft kicking into striking effect for Michigan.  Past halfway the race shook into a caution-free breeze home for Allison and Stricklin and a satisfying day for Bobby Allison.
1994: A slow stop put Rusty Wallace, in his first year in a Ford, well behind Dale Earnhardt, but Wallace handily clawed his way forward and stormed to his third straight win of the season.
1995: Chevrolet's controversial Monte Carlo dominated as Jeff Gordon was bested by Bobby Labonte; Labonte Joe Gibbs Racing Chevy ran Hendrick Motorsports engines, a fact that irked primary Hendrick driver Gordon afterward and led to plans by Gibbs to hire Mark Cronquist to organise its own engine progamme that started from 1997 to 2010.
1997: Ernie Irvan, two months removed from a controversial weekend and bad crash at Texas Motor Speedway, ran away for the Michigan win, his lone win of the season, final win for Robert Yates, and only career win at the track where he was gravely injured three years earlier.
1999: For the first and only time at Michigan, the race goes caution-free.
2001: Jeff Gordon out-dueled Ricky Rudd to score the 100th win for car owner Rick Hendrick.
2008: On Father's Day and hanging around in 5th conserving fuel, Dale Earnhardt Jr. pulled off the biggest upset of the year by winning at Michigan for the first time and snapping a 76 race winless streak (his father won 76 races) and scored his first points race win with car owner Rick Hendrick in the 88 car. At the time it was Chevrolet's first win at Michigan since Jeff Gordon won there in June 2001.
2012: First race on the new surface. Four years and two days after scoring his first win with Hendrick Motorsports, Dale Earnhardt Jr. snapped a 143 race winless streak by leading 95 of the 200 laps to score the win for the second time on Father's Day. His last win also came at Michigan on Father's Day in 2008. The race was delayed for two hours because of rain.
2014: Jimmie Johnson won his first Michigan race after a streak of bad luck that included engine failures and poor fuel strategy.
2015: Kurt Busch, driving in a back-up car, was declared the winner after the race was called for rain after 138 laps. The first 50 laps had seen three red flags resulting from persistent rain.
2017: Martin Truex Jr. led for most of the race but after a late-race debris caution, Kyle Larson bested him on the restart to win the race. It would be Larson's 2nd of 3 wins in a row at Michigan.
2019: Due to rain and FS1's broadcasts of World Cup games in France on Monday, the race started at 5 pm EDT with more than three and a half hours before sunset. Despite the fact it started late, darkness was never a factor. Joey Logano led a Michigan-record 163 of the 203 laps in a green-white-checkered finish, holding off Kurt Busch.

References

External links
 

1969 establishments in Michigan
NASCAR races at Michigan International Speedway
NASCAR Cup Series races
Recurring sporting events established in 1969
Annual sporting events in the United States